The Drammen Bridge is a motorway box girder bridge that crosses Drammenselva river in the town of Drammen in Norway.

The Drammen Bridge was opened in 1975 with two lanes. A parallel bridge was finished in 2005 with two more lanes.

The new bridge has round, slim pillars, while the old one had wide, rectangular pillars. It was decided to replace the pillars under the old bridge, with round pillars similar to the new. This work started shortly after the new bridge opened, and the bridge was closed. The replacement was finished in December, 2006.

See also
List of bridges in Norway
List of bridges in Norway by length
List of bridges
List of bridges by length

External links

An article about the new bridge (in Norwegian)
 
The World's Longest Tunnel Page (bridge section)

References

Road bridges in Viken
Bridges completed in 1975
Bridges completed in 2006
Buildings and structures in Drammen